Dyes Inlet is an inlet on the Kitsap Peninsula in western Washington, USA. Silverdale, Washington is located on the north shore of the inlet and has a marina, waterfront park, boat ramp, and boardwalk. The west shoreline is part of Chico, Washington and the east shoreline is Tracyton, Washington. Dyes Inlet is connected to Port Orchard via the Port Washington Narrows, Port Washington being an earlier name for the inlet.  It was named for John W. W. Dyes, a taxidermist with the Wilkes Expedition of 1841. Chico Creek and Clear Creek are the major fresh waterways that drain into the inlet. Both creeks have heavy salmon runs during the fall.

Dyes Inlet has hosted Unlimited Light Hydroplane races. The inlet is also referenced in Death Cab for Cutie's song 'Northern Lights' on their ninth studio album Thank You for Today.

References

External links

Inlets of Washington (state)
Bodies of water of Kitsap County, Washington